Roignais is a mountain of Savoie, France. It lies in the Beaufortain Massif range. It has an elevation of 2,995 metres above sea level.

References

Mountains of Savoie
Mountains of the Alps